This is a list of members of the 29th Legislative Assembly of Queensland from 1941 to 1944, as elected at the 1941 state election held on 29 March 1941.

 On 7 July 1941, the Labor member for Warrego, Randolph Bedford, died. Labor candidate Harry O'Shea won the resulting by-election on 30 August 1941.
 On 27 January 1942, the Labor member for Cairns and Secretary for Mines, John O'Keefe, died. Independent Labor candidate Lou Barnes, the brother of Frank Barnes, won the resulting by-election on 31 October 1942.
 On 9 December 1942, the Labor member for Mackay and Premier of Queensland, William Forgan Smith, retired. Labor candidate Fred Graham won the resulting by-election on 20 March 1943.
 On 15 December 1942, the Labor member for Barcoo and Secretary for Agriculture and Stock, Frank Bulcock, resigned to take up an appointment as Commonwealth Director-General of Agriculture. Labor candidate Ned Davis won the resulting by-election on 1 May 1943.
 On 6 February 1943, the United Australia member for Oxley, Thomas Nimmo, died. United Australia candidate Tom Kerr won the resulting by-election on 17 April 1943.
 On 30 June 1943, the Independent Democrat member for Hamilton, Bruce Pie, resigned to contest Division of Brisbane at the 1943 federal election. Lord Mayor of Brisbane and Independent candidate John Beals Chandler won the resulting by-election on 9 October 1943. He soon formed the Queensland People's Party.
 On 25 December 1943, the Independent Country member for Cunningham, William Deacon, died. No by-election was held due to the proximity of the 1944 state election.

See also
1941 Queensland state election
Forgan Smith Ministry (Labor) (1932–1942)
Cooper Ministry (Labor) (1942–1946)

References

Bibliography
 Waterson, D.B. Biographical register of the Queensland Parliament, 1930-1980 Canberra: ANU Press (1982)
 

Members of Queensland parliaments by term
20th-century Australian politicians